Todd Griffin is an American musician and  a former member of The Graveyard Train. He is pursuing a solo career and gained fame as the singer of the first version of the theme song to the popular American television series That '70s Show.

Studio albums
Trial by Fire (2003)
Mountain Man (2015)

Singles
"Train Wreck" (2015)
"God Save America" (2015)
"Green Spot Road" (2015)

References

External links
 Todd Griffin's website

American male singer-songwriters
Living people
Singer-songwriters from California
Year of birth missing (living people)
Place of birth missing (living people)